Provo is an unincorporated community located in Butler County, Kentucky, United States. Its post office closed in 2004.

References

Unincorporated communities in Butler County, Kentucky
Unincorporated communities in Kentucky